Şahin Yakut (born 8 May 1979 in Iğdır, Turkey) is a Turkish-Dutch kickboxer and mixed martial artist, currently living in Heerhugowaard, Netherlands and training in Gym Alkmaar. He is a member of the It's Showtime Team and is a training partner of Gago Drago and Joerie Mes. He is known for his in-fighter style which puts massive pressure on his opponents, his flashing kicks and above all, his endurance and ambition.

He has been involved with several organizations such as SuperLeague, It's Showtime and has taken part in special events like Challenge Private Party.  He has a 5 and 1 record in his SuperLeague career and is 17 and 3 with It's Showtime as of 29/05/2010.  Yakut has fought some of the best fighters in the world and has achieved victories against world champions such as Perry Ubeda, Jomhod Kiatadisak, Ondřej Hutník and Rayen Simson.  His brother Metin "Pislik" Yakut is an MMA fighter.

Şahin on TV
Fights on Eurosport:
Numerous fights of Yakut are broadcast by Eurosport featuring the highly in-demand fighter.  He has been involved on several occasions with the It's Showtime 75MAX Trophy, which he became champion of in 2006.  His decision victories against Jiri Zak in the quarters finals, Alviar Lima in the semis and Ondřej Hutník in the final were all aired by the channel.

His recent fights on TV:
 K-1 Italy Oktagon 2008 - super fight against Frenchman Walid Haddad in Milan, Italy on 12 April 2008 which Şahin won on points. 
 It's Showtime 75MAX Trophy Final 2008 - quarter-final fight against Belgian Mohammad Rahhoui in Den Bosch, the Netherlands on 15 March 2008 which Şahin lost on points.
 Challenge Private Party - super fight against Portuguese fighter Ricardo Fernandes in Algarve, Portugal on 8 December 2007 where Şahin dispatched his opponent by TKO in the very first round after Fernandes was unable to continue due to low kicks he had suffered.
 Klash Event - super fight against Portuguese fighter Jose Barradas in Transylvania, Romania on 11 November 2007 where Şahin dispatched his opponent by unanimous decision after 3 rounds.
 It's Showtime 2007 Portugal - super fight against French fighter Jean-Philippe Garcia at Casino Vilamoura, Algarve, Portugal in September 2007, where Şahin dispatched his opponent by TKO in just one and half minutes into the very first round.

It's Showtime Reality
 Şahin has also been involved in a martial arts TV contest called It's Showtime Reality from January 2008 on which there is a total of 12 episodes. He was a trainer for 22 fighters chosen worldwide who compete for being the winner of the show, with a final match and K-1 debut at the K-1 World Grand Prix 2008 in Amsterdam on 26 April 2008 and the possibility of earning a $100,000 contract with the It's Showtime organization.

Miscellaneous
Şahin can speak Turkish and Dutch at native level. He can speak English as well.
Şahin is pronounced as “Sha-hin” and it means falcon, while Yakut means ruby in Turkish.

Titles
Kickboxing/Muay Thai
2006 It's Showtime 75MAX Trophy (-75 kg) Champion in Rotterdam
2005 It's Showtime Prague Pool B Champion
2003 W.P.K.L. Muaythai Champions League Rome Pool B Champion
W.I.P.U. King of the Ring Champion

Mixed Martial Arts
2008 W.I.P.U. "King of the Ring" MMA super champion -77 kg

Kickboxing record 

|-
|-  bgcolor="#CCFFCC"
| 2010-05-29 || Win ||align=left| Rayen Simson || It's Showtime 2010 Amsterdam || Amsterdam, Netherlands || Decision (5-0) || 3 || 3:00 
|-
|-  bgcolor="#FFBBBB"
| 2010-01-? || Loss ||align=left| Rick Barnhill || Enfusion Kickboxing Tournament, 2nd Round || Koh Samui, Thailand || Decision || 3 || 3:00 
|-
! style=background:white colspan=9 |
|-
|-  bgcolor="#CCFFCC"
| 2010-01-? || Win ||align=left| Mikael Lallemand || Enfusion Kickboxing Tournament, 1st Round || Koh Samui, Thailand || Ext.R Decision || 4 || 3:00
|-
|-  bgcolor="#CCFFCC"
| 2009-10-24 || Win ||align=left| Morad Salhi || It's Showtime 2009 Lommel || Lommel, Belgium || Decision || 3 || 3:00 
|-
|-  bgcolor="#CCFFCC"
| 2009-05-16 || Win ||align=left| Perry Ubeda || It's Showtime 2009 Amsterdam || Amsterdam, Netherlands || Decision (Unanimous) || 3 || 3:00 
|-
|-  bgcolor="#CCFFCC"
| 2009-03-14 || Win ||align=left| Shemsi Beqiri || Oktagon presents: It's Showtime 2009 || Milan, Italy || KO (Right Hook) || 1 || 0:45
|-
|-  bgcolor="#CCFFCC"
| 2009-02-08 || Win ||align=left| Mohammed Rahhaoui || Fights at the Border presents: It's Showtime 2009 || Antwerp, Belgium || Decision (Unanimous) || 3 || 3:00 
|-
|-  bgcolor="#FFBBBB"
| 2008-11-29 || Loss ||align=left| Imro Main || It's Showtime 2008 Eindhoven || Eindhoven, Netherlands || Decision || 3 || 3:00
|-
|-  bgcolor="#CCFFCC"
| 2008-09-06 || Win ||align=left| Lucas Rambalski || It's Showtime 2008 Alkmaar || Alkmaar, Netherlands || TKO (Ref Stop/Broken Nose) || 1 || 
|-
|-  bgcolor="#CCFFCC"
| 2008-04-12 || Win ||align=left| Wallid Haddad || K-1 Italy Oktagon 2008, Super Fight || Milan, Italy || Decision (Unanimous) || 3 || 3:00 
|-
|-  bgcolor="#FFBBBB"
| 2008-03-15 || Loss ||align=left| Mohammed Rahhaoui || It's Showtime 75MAX Trophy Final 2008, Quarter Finals || 's-Hertogenbosch, Netherlands || Decision || 3 || 3:00
|-
|-  bgcolor="#CCFFCC"
| 2007-10-26 || Win ||align=left| Jose Barradas || Klash III: Show No Mercy || Sibiu, Romania || Decision (Unanimous) || 3 || 3:00
|-  bgcolor="#CCFFCC"
| 2007-10-14 || Win ||align=left| Cedric Copra || Kickboks Gala Istanbul || Istanbul, Turkey || TKO || || 
|-  bgcolor="#CCFFCC"
| 2007-09-23 || Win ||align=left| Jean-Philippe Garcia || It's Showtime 75MAX Trophy Portugal, Super Fight || Vilamoura, Portugal || TKO (Corner Stoppage) || 1 ||
|-
|-  bgcolor="#CCFFCC"
| 2007-01-13 || Win ||align=left| Wallid Haddad || K-1 Turkey Grand Prix 2007, Super Fight || Istanbul, Turkey || Decision (Unanimous) || 3 || 3:00 
|-
|-  bgcolor="#CCFFCC"
| 2006-09-23 || Win ||align=left| Ondřej Hutník || It's Showtime 75MAX Trophy Final 2006, Final || Rotterdam, Netherlands || Decision || 3 || 3:00
|-
! style=background:white colspan=9 |
|-
|-  bgcolor="#CCFFCC"
| 2006-09-23 || Win ||align=left| Alviar Lima || It's Showtime 75MAX Trophy Final 2006, Semi Finals || Rotterdam, Netherlands || Decision (Unanimous) || 3 || 3:00
|-
|-  bgcolor="#CCFFCC"
| 2006-09-23 || Win ||align=left| Jiri Zak || It's Showtime 75MAX Trophy Final 2006, Quarter Finals || Rotterdam, Netherlands || Decision (Unanimous) || 3 || 3:00
|-
|-  bgcolor="#CCFFCC"
| 2006-06-03 || Win ||align=left| Marco Piqué || Gentleman Fight Night III || Tilburg, Netherlands || KO || 4 || 
|-
|-  bgcolor="#FFBBBB"
| 2006-05-13 || Loss ||align=left| José Reis || SuperLeague Elimination 2006, Quarter Finals || Vienna, Austria || Decision || 3 || 3:00
|-
|-  bgcolor="#CCFFCC"
| 2006-03-11 || Win ||align=left| Fadi Merza || SuperLeague Apocalypse 2006 || Paris, France || Decision || 3 || 3:00
|-
|-  bgcolor="#CCFFCC"
| 2006-01-28 || Win ||align=left| Mario Princ || SuperLeague Hungary 2006 || Budapest, Hungary || TKO || 3 ||
|-
|-  bgcolor="#CCFFCC"
| 2005-12-18 || Win ||align=left| Jomhod Kiatadisak || It's Showtime 75MAX Trophy Prague, Pool B Final || Prague, Czech Republic || Ext.R Decision || 4 || 3:00
|-
! style=background:white colspan=9 |
|-
|-  bgcolor="#CCFFCC"
| 2005-12-18 || Win ||align=left| Marek Lončak || It's Showtime 75MAX Trophy Prague, Pool B Semi Finals || Prague, Czech Republic || KO || 2 || 
|-
|-  bgcolor="#CCFFCC"
| 2005-11-19 || Win ||align=left| Seyed Ahmed Moinshirazi || SuperLeague Portugal 2005 || Carcavelos, Portugal || TKO (Leg Injury) || 2 ||
|-
|-  bgcolor="#CCFFCC"
| 2005-06-12 || Win ||align=left| Ali Gunyar || It's Showtime 2005 Amsterdam || Amsterdam, Netherlands || TKO (Corner Stop/Low Kicks) || 4 || 
|-
|-  bgcolor="#CCFFCC"
| 2005-04-09 || Win ||align=left| Fadi Merza || SuperLeague Austria 2005 || Vienna, Austria || Decision || 5 || 3:00
|-
|-  bgcolor="#CCFFCC"
| 2004-11-14 || Win ||align=left| Yucel Fidan || Muay Thai/Mixed Fight Gala, Sporthal Stedenwijk || Almere, Netherlands || Decision || 5 || 3:00
|-
|-  bgcolor="#CCFFCC"
| 2004-12-18 || Win ||align=left| Mario Princ || SuperLeague Netherlands 2004 || Uden, Netherlands || TKO (Ref Stop/Knee) || 4 ||
|-
|-  bgcolor="#CCFFCC"
| 2004-01-25 || Win ||align=left| Michal Palovic || Thaiboxing & Freefight event in Alkmaar || Alkmaar, Netherlands || TKO || 2 ||
|-  bgcolor="#CCFFCC"
| 2003-09-28 || Win ||align=left| William Diender || W.P.K.L. Muay Thai Champions League XI || Rotterdam, Netherlands || Decision || 5 || 3:00 
|-
|-  bgcolor="#CCFFCC"
| 2003-04-20 || Win ||align=left| Junior Consalves || Tulp Muay Thai Gala|| Amsterdam, Netherlands || KO || 2 || 
|-  bgcolor="#CCFFCC"
| 2003-03-29 || Win ||align=left| Marco Piqué || Muaythai Champions League Rome, Pool B Final || Rome, Italy || TKO (Corner Stoppage) || 2 || 
|-
! style=background:white colspan=9 |
|-
|-  bgcolor="#CCFFCC"
| 2003-03-29 || Win ||align=left| Fabrice Allouche || Muaythai Champions League Rome, Pool B Semi Finals || Rome, Italy || Decision || 3 || 3:00 
|-
|-  bgcolor="#CCFFCC"
| 2003-03-16 || Win ||align=left| Alviar Lima || Ahoy Simply The Best VI || Rotterdam, Netherlands || Decision (Unanimous) || 5 || 3:00
|-
|-  bgcolor="#CCFFCC"
| 2003-01-26 || Win ||align=left| Tarvo Rahuoja || Gala in Schremerhorn || Schermerhorn, Netherlands || KO || 2 || 
|-  bgcolor="#CCFFCC"
| 2002-09-29 || Win ||align=left| Ron Post || It's Showtime – As Usual / Battle Time || Haarlem, Netherlands || Decision || 5 || 3:00
|-
|-  bgcolor="#CCFFCC"
| 2002-06-08 || Win ||align=left| Nabil Boukhari || W.P.K.L. Muay Thai Champions League VII || Rotterdam, Netherlands || TKO || 1 || 
|-
|-  bgcolor="#CCFFCC"
| 2002-04-27 || Win ||align=left| Joerie Mes || Gala in Schremerhorn || Schermerhorn, Netherlands || Decision || 3 || 3:00
|-
|-  bgcolor="#FFBBBB"
| 2002-02-24 || Loss ||align=left| Perry Ubeda || K-1 World Grand Prix 2002 Netherlands || Arnhem, Netherlands || Decision (Unanimous) || 12 || 2:00
|-
! style=background:white colspan=9 |
|-
|-  bgcolor="#CCFFCC"
| 2001-10-21 || Win ||align=left| Ali Gunyar || It's Showtime - Original || Haarlem, Netherlands || TKO || 3 || 
|-
|-  bgcolor="#FFBBBB"
| 2000-10-22 || Loss ||align=left| Joerie Mes || It's Showtime - Exclusive || Haarlem, Netherlands || Decision || 5 || 3:00
|-
|-  bgcolor="#CCFFCC"
| 1999-10-24 || Win ||align=left| Rogier van der Heijden || It's Showtime - It's Showtime || Haarlem, Netherlands || Decision || 5 || 3:00
|-
|-
| colspan=9 | Legend:

Mixed martial arts record 

|-
| Win
| align=center| 3-2
| Chico Martinez
| Submission (rear naked choke)
| KOE - Tough Is Not Enough
| 
| align=center| 1
| align=center| N/A
| Rotterdam, Netherlands
| 
|-
| Loss
| align=center| 2-2
| Vincent Latoel
| Decision (unanimous)
| K-1 World Grand Prix 2007 in Amsterdam
| 
| align=center| 2
| align=center| 5:00
| Amsterdam, Netherlands
| 
|-
| Win
| align=center| 2-1
| Chico Martinez
| Decision
| 2 Hot 2 Handle
| 
| align=center| 2
| align=center| 5:00
| Rotterdam, Netherlands
| 
|-
| Win
| align=center| 1-1
| Gilbert Ballentine
| TKO (doctor stoppage)
| Rings Holland: One Moment In Time
| 
| align=center| 1
| align=center| 0:51
| Utrecht, Netherlands
| 
|-
| Loss
| align=center| 0-1
| Roman Vanicky
| Unknown
| Night of the Gladiators 12
| 
| align=center| N/A
| align=center| N/A
| Prague, Czech Republic
|

See also 
List of K-1 events
List of It's Showtime events
List of It's Showtime champions
List of male kickboxers
List of male mixed martial artists

References

External links

It's Showtime
Yakut, the Super League profile and record
A sample of his style: His encounter against Thai Fighter Jomhod Kiatadisak

1979 births
Living people
Dutch male kickboxers
Turkish male kickboxers
Middleweight kickboxers
Dutch male mixed martial artists
Turkish male mixed martial artists
Lightweight mixed martial artists
Mixed martial artists utilizing Muay Thai
Mixed martial artists utilizing kickboxing
Dutch Muay Thai practitioners
Turkish Muay Thai practitioners
Sportspeople from Iğdır
Dutch people of Turkish descent
Turkish emigrants to the Netherlands